Mátyás Borlói (born 26 September 1952) is a Hungarian former swimmer. He competed in three events at the 1968 Summer Olympics.

References

1952 births
Living people
Hungarian male swimmers
Olympic swimmers of Hungary
Swimmers at the 1968 Summer Olympics
Swimmers from Budapest